Kendall Francis Schmidt (born November 2, 1990) is an American singer, songwriter, dancer, music producer, and actor. He played Kendall Knight in Big Time Rush, and is a current member of the boyband with the same name, and has had small roles on TV shows such as ER, Without a Trace, Phil of the Future, Ghost Whisperer, Gilmore Girls, School of Rock and Frasier.

Early life
Schmidt was born in Wichita, Kansas, to Kathy and Kent Schmidt. His brothers, Kenneth Schmidt and Kevin Schmidt, are actors. He is of German descent. He began his acting career at age five, appearing in a Chex TV commercial. When he was nine years old, he was one of two young actors who were hired to be Haley Joel Osment's stand-in and body double (they shared the same agent) in the Steven Spielberg film A.I. Artificial Intelligence. He celebrated his birthday on the set, and Spielberg and the cast surprised him with a birthday cake decorated with Star Wars figures. When he was 10 years old, his family finally made the move from Kansas to California.

Career

2001: Career beginning

In 2001, Schmidt soon landed recurring roles on General Hospital, Titus, Raising Dad, Gilmore Girls and CSI: Miami. He guest-starred on a variety of TV shows, including ER, MADtv, Easy A, Frasier and Phil of the Future. Kendall also guest starred on Without a Trace and Ghost Whisperer. On the big screen, he has appeared in Minority Report and According to Spencer.

2009: Big Time Rush
In 2009, Schmidt was cast as the lead of the TV show Big Time Rush. Kendall portrays a character like himself with the name of Kendall Knight, the calm and relaxed member of Big Time Rush. He also was a member of boy band Big Time Rush. Nickelodeon signed Big Time Rush and the debut album, titled BTR, was released on October 11, 2010 and debuted at number 3 on the Billboard 200. Later was certified Gold for shipments of 500,000 copies in the U.S. In November 2010, it was announced that a Christmas special of Big Time Rush would debut later that month, and that a Christmas EP would be released to coincide with the episode. On November 30, 2010, they released the Holiday EP Holiday Bundle, with two songs: "Beautiful Christmas" and the cover of "All I Want for Christmas is You", originally performed by Mariah Carey. On February 15, 2011, "Boyfriend" was released as the band's first official single to mainstream US radio and peaked at number seventy-two on the Billboard Hot 100, becoming their most successful song to date.

Schmidt and the group announced they would be recording their second studio album, just after Nickelodeon renewed the series for a third season. Their second album, Elevate, was released on November 21, 2011 and debuted at number 12 on the Billboard 200, selling over 70,000 copies in its first week. Though for a lower peaking than their previous, the album sold more copies than the previous album. The first single, "Music Sounds Better with U", was released on November 1, 2011. He announced would be starring in their full-length 2012 film, Big Time Movie. In 2013 Nickelodeon renewed the Big Time Rush series for a 13-episode fourth season, production started on January 7. Their third album, 24/Seven, was released on June 11, 2013 and led many critics to draw comparisons between the band's third album and NSYNC's fourth album Celebrity. The band ended in 2014.

2014–present: Heffron Drive and reunion with Big Time Rush
Schmidt announced that he returned to the duo Heffron Drive, which he had before Big Time Rush. Schmidt's first single with Heffron Drive, "Parallel" from the album Happy Mistakes, was released in March 2014 through his very own record label TOLBooth Records. On January 14, 2017, the band released a new song and music video for their single "Living Room". Their next release was on January 19, 2018, when they released a new song and music video titled "Mad At The World". Their latest release is "Black on Black".

On April 20, 2020, Kendall reunited virtually with his former members as they uploaded a video on the band's social media platforms, sharing some wishes to their fans about the COVID-19 pandemic.

Personal life 
Kendall Schmidt got engaged to his girlfriend of seven years, Mica Von Turkovich on June 30, 2022.

Filmography

Films

Television

Web

Discography

Promotional singles

Albums appearances

Writing credits

References

External links

Official Site of Big Time Rush

1990 births
Living people
21st-century American male actors
21st-century American singers
Actors from Wichita, Kansas
American bloggers
American child singers
American dance musicians
American male bloggers
American male child actors
American male film actors
American male guitarists
American male pop singers
American male singers
American male television actors
American male voice actors
American people of German descent
American pop rock singers
American rock singers
American rock songwriters
Big Time Rush (band) members
Columbia Records artists
Guitarists from Kansas
Male actors from Kansas
Musicians from Wichita, Kansas
People from Andover, Kansas
Singers from Kansas
Songwriters from Kansas